Rainbows For Life (May 17, 1988 – September 1, 2012) was a Canadian Thoroughbred racehorse. Bred and raced by Sam-Son Farm, he was trained by Olympic Gold Medalist and Canadian Horse Racing Hall of Fame inductee, Jim Day.

A multiple Graded stakes race winner who competed successfully on both grass and dirt, Rainbows For Life won three Sovereign Awards for racing.

At stud
Sold to Czech Republic breeders, Rainbows For Life was the Leading sire in the Czech Republic in 1999, 2004, 2005, 2006, and the Leading sire in Slovakia in 1999. He also stood at stud in Australia, but with limited success. 

Rainbows for Life was euthanized in the Czech Republic on September 1, 2012, due to the infirmities of old age.

References
 Rainbow For Life's pedigree and partial racing stats
 Canadian Champion Rainbows for Life Dies

1988 racehorse births
2012 racehorse deaths
Racehorses bred in Ontario
Racehorses trained in Canada
Sovereign Award winners
Thoroughbred family 14-b